Arturo Herviz Reyes (born 12 July 1954) is a Mexican politician affiliated with the PRD. As of 2013 he served as Senator of the LX and LXI Legislatures of the Mexican Congress representing Veracruz. He also served as Deputy during the LVIII Legislature, as well as a local deputy in the LVII Legislature en el Congress of Veracruz.

References

1954 births
Living people
Politicians from Veracruz
Members of the Senate of the Republic (Mexico)
Members of the Chamber of Deputies (Mexico)
Party of the Democratic Revolution politicians
21st-century Mexican politicians
20th-century Mexican politicians
Members of the Congress of Veracruz